2021 United States capitol protests may refer to:

2020–21 United States election protests, some of which occurred at the United States Capitol and in state capitols
January 6 United States Capitol attack, which occurred after a nearby protest
2021 United States inauguration week protests, which occurred in various state capitols
Justice for J6 rally, demonstration that occurred in support of hundreds of people who were arrested and charged following the United States Capitol attack